Stixwould railway station was a station in Stixwould, Lincolnshire, England.

History

The station was also the site of the Stixwould ferry across the River Witham, which closed in the 1960s.

The station building and signal box have been converted into a private dwelling and guest house called Time Away. The line has become part of the Water Rail Way, supported by Sustrans. The platforms survive and one has a station name board.

Route

References

Disused railway stations in Lincolnshire
Former Great Northern Railway stations
Railway stations in Great Britain opened in 1848
Railway stations in Great Britain closed in 1970
Beeching closures in England